Close combat is a combat situation between two or more opponents at short range. Since the rise of ranged weapons and firearms, the term has been used to specifically refer to melee combat.

Armed and unarmed confrontations
Among many types of fighting encompassed by the general term close combat are the modern terms hand-to-hand combat (HTH) and close-quarters combat (CQC). Close combat occurs when opposing military forces engage in restricted areas, an environment frequently encountered in urban warfare. Military small unit tactics traditionally regarded as forms of close combat include fighting with hand-held or hand-thrown weapons such as swords, knives, axes, or tools.

Since World War II, the term "close combat" has also come to describe unarmed hand-to-hand combat, as well as combat involving firearms and other distance weapons when used at short range, generally within a 100 meters (110 yards) or less. William E. Fairbairn, who organized and led the famous Shanghai Riot Squad of the Shanghai Municipal Police, devised a system of close-combat fighting for both soldiers and civilians which bears his name, the "Fairbairn system", incorporating use of the handgun, knife, and the defendu martial art fighting technique. Since that time, the term "close combat" has also been used to describe a short-range physical confrontation between antagonists not involved in a military conflict, for example in riots and other violent conflicts between law enforcement and civilians.

Examples
 The Battle of Isandlwana on 22 January 1879, the first battle in the Anglo-Zulu War, turned into close combat when the British exhausted their ammunition. It resulted in a decisive victory for Zulus over the modern British army.

 On October 22, 1986, during the Pudu Prison siege, the Special Actions Unit (special ops unit of the Royal Malaysia Police) turned to hand-to-hand combat, using batons and rattan canes, after the Malaysian Prime Minister ordered the resolution of the hostage crisis without the use of firearms. The result was a victory for the police, and the five prisoners holding hostages in Pudu Prison were arrested.

 Battle of Danny Boy took place close to the city of Amarah in southern Iraq on 14 May 2004, between British soldiers and about 100 Iraqi insurgents of the Mahdi Army. The insurgents ambushed a patrol of Argyll and Sutherland Highlanders close to a checkpoint known as Danny Boy near Majar al-Kabir. The Argylls called in reinforcements from the 1st Battalion of the Princess of Wales's Royal Regiment; the latter were also ambushed and due to an electronic communications failure it was some time before further British relief arrived. While waiting for reinforcements the British were involved in one of the fiercest engagements they fought in Iraq. The fighting involved close-quarter rifle fire and bayonets. The battle lasted for about three hours during which 28 Mahdi Army insurgents were killed; the British suffered some wounded, but none were killed in the action.

Battle of Spotsylvania Court House during the American Civil War. The men of the Northern and Southern armies were periodically forced into a bloody hand to hand struggle reminiscent of ancient battles, with the men using swords, knives, bayonets, and even sticks and bare hands.

See also
 Close-quarters combat
 Charge (warfare)
 Melee weapon
 Combatives
 Ranged weapon

References

Hybrid martial arts
Hand